Cyclotorna egena is a moth of the family Cyclotornidae. It is found in Australia, including New South Wales and Queensland.

Original description

Life history
First instar larvae parasitise Psyllidae species. In some species early ecdyses occur in silk shelters spun on the body of the leafhopper host. It is probable that the life history is similar to that of Cyclotorna monocentra.

References

External links
Proceedings of the Linnean Society of New South Wales

Moths of Australia
Cyclotornidae
Moths described in 1912
Taxa named by Edward Meyrick